Tal der Ahnungslosen (Valley of the Clueless), in the culture of East Germany, was a sarcastic designation for two regions in the southeast and northeast parts of East Germany that generally were not able to receive television broadcasts from West Germany from the mid-to-late 1950s, including the public broadcasters ARD and ZDF, to early 1990 just prior to German reunification. 

East Germans used the name ARD with the abbreviation jokingly standing for Außer (except) Rügen und Dresden since the programmes could be seen in all other parts of East Germany, such as Erfurt, Leipzig, Magdeburg, Rostock, and Schwerin. West German television stations were widely considered to be more reliable in their coverage than their Communist East German counterparts, Fernsehen der DDR, and therefore the people who could not receive those stations were thought to be less well informed about the contemporary situation in their country and in the world, despite having access to some Western radio. The West German broadcasters took measures to cover as much of East Germany as possible, building high-powered transmitter sites on the highest ground possible near the border (as well as in West Berlin) and placing ARD on the VHF Band I channels which carried the farthest. Notable in this regard was the transmitter on Ochsenkopf in Bavaria, which covered much of southern East Germany with ARD on VHF channel E4 (61-68 MHz), but required the use of large and conspicuous antennas nicknamed Ochsenkopfantenne for reception.

Tony Judt wrote that by mid-1980s the authorities ran a cable from West Germany to the Dresden area, as he says, "in the wishful belief that if East Germans could watch West German television at home they would not feel the need to emigrate". In fact, a 2009 study of the opened Stasi documents revealed that the dissatisfaction with the regime was recorded higher in the "Valley of the Clueless".

Effects of these media exposure differences have been found to last a decade into Germany reunification, with those not exposed to Western television broadcasts less inclined to believe that effort rather than luck determines success in life.

See also 
 Deutscher Fernsehfunk
 Der schwarze Kanal
 Ochsenkopf Transmitter

References

External links 
 Fernsehempfang im Tal der Ahnungslosen Television reception in Tal der Ahnungslosen
 Im Tal der Ahnungslosen - Westfernsehen Marke Eigenbau Homegrown West TV 
 Video (in German)

Geography of East Germany
Mass media in East Germany
German words and phrases
East German culture
German humour
1950s neologisms